Charles II, Duke of Elbeuf (5 November 1596 – 5 November 1657), was a French nobleman, the son of Charles I, Duke of Elbeuf, by his wife, Marguerite de Chabot. He succeeded his father in the Elbeuf dukedom (Elbœuf is an alternate, anglicized spelling) in 1605.

Biography 

He joined the French royal court in 1607, becoming a playmate to the future King Louis XIII. When the latter reached his majority, Charles was appointed Grand Chamberlain of France. He was a loyal servant to the King, of assistance in conflicts with Marie de' Medici, Cardinal Richelieu, and the Huguenots. The Duke of Longueville, governor of Normandy, and loyal to Queen Marie, led a revolt against the king and established camps at Orival, near Elbeuf. The king and Richelieu were the main targets of the revolt, and Charles was appointed governor of Normandy. He took part in the siege of Rochelle, but was wounded at Saint-Jean-d'Angély. He was given the additional post of governor of Picardy.

He died at Paris in 1657.

Marriage and children 

On 20 June 1619 he married Catherine Henriette de Bourbon, called Mademoiselle de Vendôme,2 an illegitimate daughter of King Henry IV of France by Gabrielle d'Estrées. They had six children:
 Charles III of Elbeuf (1620 – 4 May 1692)
Henri (1622 – 3 April 1648) never married; Abbot of Hombieres
François Louis, Count of Harcourt (1623 – 27 June 1694), married and had issue;
François Marie, Prince of Lillebonne (4 April 1624 – 19 January 1694); married and had issue
Catherine (1626–1645)
Marie Marguerite (1629 – 7 August 1679) known as Mademoiselle d'Elbœuf; died unmarried and childless

Child with Jeanne-Françoise Schotte (family, Van den Gersmoortere alias Schotte, the lords of Herbais):
 Charlotte Françoise Adrienne, born 1638

References and notes

 The Peerage

1596 births
1657 deaths
Charles 02
House of Lorraine
17th-century peers of France
Field marshals of the Holy Roman Empire
Military personnel from Paris